A meeting house (meetinghouse, meeting-house) is a building where religious and sometimes public meetings take place.

Terminology
Nonconformist Protestant denominations distinguish between a
 church, which is a body of people who believe in Christ, and;
 meeting house or chapel, which is a building where the church meets.

In early Methodism, meeting houses were typically called preaching houses (to distinguish it from a church house), which hosted itinerant preachers.

Meeting houses in America

The colonial meeting house in America was typically the first public building built as new villages sprang up. A meeting-house had a dual purpose as a place of worship and for public discourse, but sometimes only for "...the service of God."  As the towns grew and the separation of church and state in the United States matured the buildings which were used as the seat of local government were called a town-house or town-hall.

The nonconformist meeting houses generally do not have steeples, with the term "steeplehouses" being used to describe traditional or establishment religious buildings.  
Christian denominations which use the term "meeting house" to refer to the building in which they hold their worship include:
Anabaptist congregations
Amish congregations
Mennonite congregations
Congregational churches with their congregation-based system of church governance.  They also use the term "mouth-houses"  to emphasize their use as a place for discourse and discussion.
Christadelphians
The Church of Jesus Christ of Latter-day Saints (Mormons) uses the term "meetinghouse" for the building where congregations meet for weekly worship services, recreational events, and social gatherings. A meetinghouse differs from an LDS temple, which is reserved for special forms of worship.
Provisional Movement
Religious Society of Friends (Quakers), see Friends meeting houses
Spiritual Christians from Russia
Some Unitarian congregations, although some prefer the term "chapel" or "church".
The Unification Church

The meeting house in England
In England, a meeting house is distinguished from a church or cathedral by being a place of worship for dissenters or nonconformists.

See also
Moot hall
Chapel § Modern usage

References

Sources
Congdon, Herbert Wheaton. Old Vermont Houses 1763–1850. William L. Bauhan: 1940, 1973. .
Duffy, John J., et al. Vermont: An Illustrated History. American Historical Press: 2000. .

Local government
Types of church buildings